Kunimaipa is a Papuan language of New Guinea. The varieties are divergent, on the verge of being distinct languages, and have separate literary traditions.

Phonemes

Consonants
Below is a chart of Kunimaipa consonants.

Vowels

 “ i, e, a, o, and u”

Morphophonemics 
Each stem that ends with a has three kinds of allomorphs: a, o, and e. Allomorphs end with a in a word finally or before a syllable with a. It is the most common ending. O ending appears before syllables with o, u, or ai. E ending appears before syllable with e or i. All of above holds true, except the ending syllable before -ma. In the general morphophonemic rule, ending a appears before syllable with a. In the case of -ma, o appears before the syllable with a. For example, the sentence so-ma, meaning ‘I will go.’

Words

Non-suffixed
Word classes that are usually not suffixed are responses, exclamations, attention particles, vocative particles, conjunctions, names, and particles. Responses are short replies on a conversation; such as, kara  'okay', ee  'yes', gu  'yes', ev  'no'. Exclamations is usually occurs on sentence boundary; such as, auma  'surprise', au  'mistake', maize  'regret', and aip  'dislike'. Attention particles are only used on reported speech; such as, gui  'call to come', ae  'attention getter', and siu  'attention getter -close'. Vocative particles are beginning of addresses in sentence boundary; such as, engarim  'hey, woman', erom  'hey, man', engarohol  'hey, children', and guai  'uncle'. Conjunctions are links in "phrases, clauses, and sentences"; such as, mete  'and, but, then', ma  'or, and', povoza  'therefore', and ong  'but, then'. Names label person, place, days, and months; such as, made-ta-ka, 'on Monday', and pode-ta-ka, 'on Thursday'. Lastly, one particles that is used in introducing a quote is never suffixed, pata meaning 'reply'.

Suffixed or non-suffixed 
Word classes including adjectives, pronouns, interrogative words, nouns, and verbs can be suffixed or non-suffixed depending on the meaning and usage. Some example of adjectives in Kunimaipa are tina 'good', goe 'small', and hori 'bad'. The Kunimaipa language has 7 pronouns, including ne, ni, pi, rei, rari, aru, and paru. Example of od interrogative words are taira and tai meaning 'what'. Noun is a large word class including words such as abana 'men', abanaro 'young men', no nai nai 'everything', and mapo 'all'.

Not Classified According to suffixation 
The word classes that cannot be classified by suffixation are locations, temporals, adverbs, and auxiliaries.

References

Further reading
 
 
 Dobrin, Lisa. n.d. Noun classification in Weri. Unpublished manuscript, Department of Anthropology, University of Virginia.

Languages of Central Province (Papua New Guinea)
Goilalan languages